Zoysieae is a tribe of grasses in subfamily Chloridoideae, with around 250 species in four genera. All species use the C4 photosynthetic pathway.

The 4 genera are classified in these subtribes:

References

Chloridoideae
Poaceae tribes